John Machacek (February 18, 1940 – July 24, 2020) was an American reporter.

Machacek was born in Cedar Rapids, Iowa. Working for The Times-Union of Rochester, New York, in 1971, he and Richard Cooper covered the Attica Prison riot. Their reporting was recognized with the 1972 Pulitzer Prize for Spot Reporting.

References

American male journalists
Pulitzer Prize winners for journalism
1940 births
2020 deaths
People from Cedar Rapids, Iowa
Journalists from Iowa